Byron David Trott (born December 2, 1958) is the founder, chairman and CEO of BDT Capital Partners, a merchant bank that provides advice and capital to family and founder-led companies. Formerly, Trott was vice chairman of Investment Banking at Goldman Sachs. As of 2010, it was widely reported that he has a trusting relationship with Warren Buffett.

Early life and education 
Raised in Union, Missouri, Trott received an AB from the University of Chicago in 1981, and an MBA from the University of Chicago Booth School of Business in 1982. As an undergraduate, he played on the varsity baseball and football teams, and joined the Chi Upsilon chapter of Phi Gamma Delta. Trott was the 1981 recipient of the Amos Alonzo Stagg Medal, an award presented to the senior male student-athlete at the University of Chicago with the best overall record for academics, athletics and character.

Professional career 
In 1982, Trott joined Goldman Sachs as a stockbroker, joining Goldman's investment banking division in 1988 and serving underneath future U.S. Treasury Secretary Henry Paulson.  He eventually rose to become vice chairman of investment banking at Goldman Sachs. He advised many of the wealthiest families and closely held companies in deals ranging from the $23 billion Mars-Wrigley combination, the Pritzkers’ $4.5 billion sale of Marmon Holdings to Berkshire Hathaway, and the $5 billion capital infusion from Berkshire Hathaway into Goldman Sachs in September 2008 during the financial crisis.

Trott left Goldman Sachs in early 2009 to strike out on his own. He runs Chicago-based BDT Capital Partners. BDT Capital Partners is a merchant bank that provides long-term capital and advice through its affiliate BDT & Company to help family and founder-led businesses pursue their strategic and financial objectives. BDT Capital Partners manages more than $33 billion across its investment funds from its global limited partner investor base. Among the fund’s investments are a partnership with the Stephen family in Weber-Stephen Products, a manufacturer of barbecue grills; a minority investment in Tory Burch LLC; a partnership with Alliance management and co-investors in Alliance Laundry Systems, the world’s leading commercial laundry equipment manufacturer. BDT Capital Partners partnered with founder and CEO Mark Kaufman on an investment in Athletico Physical Therapy, a provider of orthopedic rehabilitation services.  Additional minority portfolio investments include Peet’s Coffee & Tea, Caribou Coffee, Einstein Bros. Bagels and Krispy Kreme Doughnuts, in addition to JDE and Keurig Green Mountain, all in partnership with JAB, the investment vehicle of the Reimann family from Germany. On June 14, 2019, it was announced that BDT bought a majority stake alongside the Dobson family  in the Texas burger chain Whataburger. 

From an advisory standpoint, BDT & Company has advised many leading business-owning families and their companies, including Alberto-Culver, Carlson, Cox Enterprises, EXOR, Guardian Industries, Guthy-Renker, Hyatt, JAB, Mars, Molex, S. C. Johnson & Son, and Wrigley.

Personal life 
Trott serves as a trustee of the University of Chicago, founded the Jeff Metcalf Internship Program and helped to launch the Trott Business Program, which provides undergraduate UChicago students with practical work experience and mentoring. Trott also is a director of Conservation International and in 2011 was inducted into the Horatio Alger Association of Distinguished Americans and now serves as President of the Association.

References

External link

Living people
1958 births
American investment bankers
American stockbrokers
Berkshire Hathaway
Businesspeople from Missouri
Goldman Sachs people
People from Union, Missouri
University of Chicago Booth School of Business alumni
University of Chicago alumni
University of Chicago trustees
American chief executives